Enrico Carfagnini, O.F.M. (also known as Henry Carfagnini; 23 March 1823 – 2 December 1904) was an Italian Friar Minor and educator, who served as the Bishop of Harbour Grace, Newfoundland from 1870 to 1880. He was also Bishop of Gallipoli, Italy, from 1880 to 1898.

Cargagnini resigned his see in 1898 and was appointed the Titular archbishop of Cius.

References
 
 

1823 births
1904 deaths
People from Aversa
Italian Friars Minor
19th-century Italian Roman Catholic bishops
Italian Roman Catholic missionaries
Franciscan missionaries
Roman Catholic bishops of Grand Falls
19th-century Italian Roman Catholic titular archbishops
20th-century Italian Roman Catholic titular archbishops
Newfoundland and Labrador religious figures
Newfoundland Colony people
Roman Catholic missionaries in Canada
Italian expatriates in Canada